Roberto Barbi (born 25 March 1965), born in Switzerland but Tuscan of Bagni di Lucca, is a former Italian long-distance runner who specialized in the marathon. He was banned from sports for life in 2009, after his second EPO positive.

Biography
He finished twentieth in the marathon event at the 1999 World Championships, and 37th at the 1999 World Half Marathon Championships. He also competed at the 2001 World Championships, but was disqualified.

His personal best marathon time was 2:10:12 hours, achieved in October 2000 in Venice. He had 1:02:09 hours in the half marathon, achieved in April 1999 in Milan.

Doping
In 1996 Barbi tested positive for Ephedrine and was subsequently handed a three-month ban from sports.

In 2001 he tested positive for EPO in a sample collected 30 July, the day he'd arrived in Edmonton for the 2001 World Athletics Championships. His result from the marathon was disqualified, and he received a four-year ban from sports. The ban was later reduced to 25 months, after he cooperated with the Italian anti-doping authorities and police, giving detailed information about his doping. He admitted to have used EPO since 1998.

In 2008 he tested positive for both EPO and Ephedrine. The sample was delivered on 20 July 2008 in an in-competition test in Mende, Lozère. This time he received a suspension for life.

History of disqualifications
Barbi, despite having been repeatedly disqualified, has repeatedly violated the terms of his disqualification by participating in running competitions.

1998: 4 mouths for ephedrine
2001: 4 years until 31 August 2005 (he will be 40 years old)
2009: disqualification for life
2009: reduced disqualification until 9 March 2024 (he will be 59 years old)
2018: 8 years until 29 July 2032 (he will be 67 years old)
2020: 15 years until 28 July 2047 (he will be 82 years old)

Achievements
All results regarding marathon, unless stated otherwise

References

External links
 

1965 births
Living people
Italian male long-distance runners
Italian male marathon runners
Doping cases in athletics
Italian sportspeople in doping cases
World Athletics Championships athletes for Italy
Sportspeople from the Province of Lucca